AS Police (Libreville) is a football club from Gabon based in Libreville in the Estuaire Province.

The team has played many seasons in Gabon Championnat National D1.

In 1973–1974 the club has won the Gabon Championnat National D1.

Stadium
Currently the team plays at the Stade Omar Bongo.

Honours
Gabon Championnat National D1:

References

External links

TRECCANI

Police
Police association football clubs